Return of Shanghai Joe is a 1975 Western film directed by Bitto Albertini and starring Klaus Kinski.

Plot
The medicine show man Bill Cannon gives refuge to the bandit Pedro Gomez, who is wounded by the men of Barnes. Before dying, Gomez suggests that Cannon should bring in his body to collect bounty. Bill is subsequently robbed by Barnes' men, but they are stopped with kung fu fighting by the Chinese Shanghai Joe. Cannon steals his horse, but Joe follows and convinces him that they should be friends.

In town Joe helps Cannon at gambling and force a bartender to eat crooked dice. Cannon helps Joe at an ambush by Barnes' men, and later helps him escape when he is to be lynched on a trumped up charge. They get support from the judge. The two men attack Barnes’ ranch and the latter is killed by Cannon in a fight on top of a cliff.

When it is disclosed that Joe is a federal agent Cannon at first leaves in disgust, but then he comes back and they leave together.

Cast
 Klaus Kinski - Pat Barnes
 Cheen Lie - Shanghai Joe
 Tommy Polgár - Bill Cannon
 Karin Field - Carol Finney
 Fortunato Arena - Sheriff Wilson
 Paolo Casella
 Roberto Dell'Acqua
 Consalvo Dell'Arti
 Attilio Dottesio - Village Elder
 Tom Felleghy - Judge Finney
 Claudio Giorgi - Manuel
 Renato Malavasi
 Riccardo Petrazzi
 Renzo Pevarello
 Claudio Ruffini
 Pietro Torrisi

Release
Return of Shanghai Joe was released in Italy on 28 February 1975. It was released in Germany on 27 May 1977.

Reception
From retrospective reviews, Thomas Weisser, author of a book reviewing Spaghetti Westerns, stated that Klaus Kinski gave a "surprisingly dignified performance" but that the film was predominantly filmed for laughs and lost the tone of the original film and was "almost as wretched as Kung Fu Brothers in the Wild West".

References

External links

1975 films
1970s Italian-language films
1975 Western (genre) films
Spaghetti Western films
Films directed by Bitto Albertini
1970s Italian films